Seán Lowry (born 24 February 1952) is an Irish former Gaelic footballer. His league and championship career at senior level with the Offaly and Mayo county teams spanned fifteen seasons from 1971 to 1985.

Lowry made his debut on the inter-county scene at the age of seventeen when he was selected for the Offaly minor team. He spent two championship seasons with the minor team, however, he enjoyed little success during that time. Lowry subsequently joined the Offaly under-21 team, winning All-Ireland medals in 1971 and 1973. By this stage he had also joined the Offaly senior team, after being added to the extended panel during the 1971 championship. Over the course of the next fourteen years, Lowry won three All-Ireland medals, beginning with back-to-back championships in 1971 and 1972, and a final victory in 1982. He also won six Leinster medals, one Connacht medal with Mayo and two All-Stars. He played his last inter-county championship game in August 1985.

Lowry's brothers, Mick and Brendan, also won All-Ireland medals with Offaly in 1982. His nephew, Shane Lowry, is a professional golfer. Sean's brother-in-law lives in Chicago, Illinois with his family in the Edison Park neighborhood.

Honours
Ferbane
Offaly Senior Football Championship (3): 1971, 1974, 1976

Offaly
All-Ireland Senior Football Championship (3): 1971, 1972, 1982
Leinster Senior Football Championship (6): 1971, 1972, 1973, 1980, 1981, 1982

Mayo
Connacht Senior Football Championship (1): 1985

Leinster
Railway Cup (1): 1974

References

1952 births
Living people
All Stars Awards winners (football)
ESB people
Ferbane Gaelic footballers
Seán
Offaly inter-county Gaelic footballers
Leinster inter-provincial Gaelic footballers
Crossmolina Gaelic footballers
Mayo inter-county Gaelic footballers
Winners of three All-Ireland medals (Gaelic football)